Delhi Public School, Vasant Kunj (DPS Vasant Kunj or DPS VK) is a school located in Vasant Kunj, New Delhi, India. DPS Vasant Kunj offers academic services from Kindergarten through Grade XII. The school has a combined strength of 205 teachers at the senior and junior level, and an enrollment of four thousand students.

The students in the school are divided into six houses;

History 
Delhi Public School, Vasant Kunj, was established in 1991 by the Delhi Public School Society under the leadership of Vinay Kumar, running its afternoon shift in DPS Vasant Vihar. The school moved to its present campus in Vasant Kunj in 1994.

Academics 
Delhi Public School Vasant Kunj is affiliated with the Central Board for Secondary Education (CBSE). The school offers a common curriculum up to Grade 10, along with the option of a foreign language like French, German, Japanese and Sanskrit. In Grade 11 and Grade 12, the school requires students to choose one of three 5-subject streams: Science (with Biology or Computer Science or Economics or Fashion Studies or Informative Practices or Physical Education and Psychology), Commerce, or Humanities.

The school offers several one of a kind subject choices in 11th and 12th grade like legal studies, music, dance etc. Apart from that students also have the option of studying maths along with humanities subjects.
The school is considered among the top schools in India, always ranked within the top 50 by several publications.

Student life

Student clubs 

Under the aegis of the DPS Society, the Council for Environmental Education for Children (colloquially CEEC or Environment Council) was formed at the school in 1994. Today, the CEEC has more than 100 members. Students have participated in activities with organizations such as The Energy and Resources Institute, World Wildlife Fund, Development Alternatives and Kids for Tigers. The council conducts air-monitoring and water-monitoring workshops annually and has banned the use of plastic bags in school. A team from the Council also participated in the 'Greening with Goethe' Environment Conference, Bangalore in December 2011, where it received a commendation from the group of scientists from both Germany and India.

DPS Vasant Kunj started its computer club, the Code Warriors, in the year 1997.
The Code Warriors not only participate in competitions but also share and develop the technology. Some of the prize-winning software developed by the Code Warriors are N-crypt It, Map Builder, Canon, Graphics, and Digital Messenger, among others. Code Warriors have also gone on to innovate in tech fields, notably, forming the core team behind MapMyIndia.com, a popular site which now powers services like Yahoo! Maps India.

The school's dramatics club "Rubaru" was established in 2010 and has 30 members who have won more than 50 events in different parts of India.

Grey Matters, the DPS Vasant Kunj's quiz club, was established in 2006 first and later reinstated by the Former Presidents Manik Thakar and Saksham Sharma and their legendary Vice Presidents Kaustubh Pant and Arnesh Chakraborty,  and has won several quizzes - Quiz Thailand, Mod Quizebate, Japan Quiz, Columban Open Quiz, and Bournvita Quiz Contest chief among them. Grey Matters organises its own eponymous interschool quiz competition. During and post the corona pandemic, the club was revived and kept alive through efforts of the presidents Aryan Baibaswata and Anirudh Singh among others, and won an impressive 2nd place at Columban Open Quiz 2022. It continues to have among its ranks some of the school's sharpest minds. 

Between 2004 and 2008, the school sent a delegation every year to Global Classrooms: Delhi Public School MUN, which was hosted by Delhi Public School, RK Puram in New Delhi. The school won the coveted Secretary General's Award for the Best Overall Delegation at the Global Classrooms: Delhi Public School MUN in 2006, 2007 and 2008. Students from the school have been selected on scholarships for six-member and ten-member delegations representing the country at international conferences, including the UNA-USA Model UN Conference held at the UN Headquarters in New York City, and the UNA-USA Pacific Rim International MUN in Los Angeles.

In 2004, the school established a Consumer Care Council (3Cs), responsible for spreading information on consumer awareness rights, duties, responsibilities and acts against malpractices. In 2010, the Consumer Care Council organized CONFEST 2010, a consumer awareness festival for local schools.

Hostel life at DPS Vasant Kunj
 
The DPS VK hostel was built in 1999. It is a three-storeyed brick structure that houses 36 girls and 36 boys. The hostel provides ambient study environment and nutritious and hygienic food all throughout the year .

Athletics 
The school sends teams for basketball, football (soccer), tennis and cricket tournaments, and has facilities for volleyball and badminton. Sports training is conducted after school hours.

The football team has won, and finished as first runners-up in several national, zonal and inter-school tournaments, including the ONGC Cup, the Inter-DPS tournament and the ESPN-Star Sports Junior Premier League. Students have represented Delhi State and India under 13 and under 14, and have been selected for India under 16 football team.

The school basketball team has finished amongst the medal positions in tournaments across the country, and several have played for their states at the national level.

Exchange programs 
The school has hosted academic and cultural exchange programs with Bukit Panjang Government High School (Singapore), Mauritius College (Mauritius) and Moerike Gymnasium Esslingen (Germany). The school is also a part of the German Youth Camp Programme organised by Goethe Institut, New Delhi.

Notable alumni 

 Jayant Yadav - Cricketer

References

External links
 Official website
 Grey Matters official website
 Code Warriors official website

Schools in Delhi
Delhi Public School Society
1991 establishments in Delhi
Educational institutions established in 1991